The Water And Sanitation Agency (WASA)      is a Governmental body responsible for planning, designing, development and maintenance, repair and operations of water supply and sewerage and draining system in Pakistan. A compulsory element of this mandate is to provide a safe, reliable and efficient water supply to satisfy the demand of all government and public sectors.

History 
Water And Sanitation Agency (WASA) was established by Lahore Development Authority in 1976.

Structure 
The Water And Sanitation Agency (WASA) is chaired by the Managing Director (MD), currently WASA Lahore headed by Mr Ghufran Ahmed, he has over 25 years of experience in Operations, Engineering & Management in relvelent field. and further assisted by three Deputy Managing Directors (DMDs) that are DMD (F&R) Finance, Administration and Revenue, DMD (O&M) Operation & Maintenance, and DMD (E) Engineering.

WASA Faisalabad headed by M.D Engg. Jabbar Anwar Ch and M.D WASA Rawalpindi Mr Muhammad Tanver headed  since 2022.

Functions 
Water And Sanitation Agency (WASA) is essentially responsible for Planning, Designing and Construction of Water Supply for:
 Rehabilitation of the existing Water supply System.
 Operation and Maintenance (O&M) of Water Supply, Sewerge and Drainage
 Billing and Collection of all fees and Charges for the services provided to its consumer.
 Undertaking Bulk Production, filtration/treatment, transmission & retail distribution purifying of water.
 Collection, Pumping, Treatment & Disposal of Sewage & Industrial Waste Water.
Enforcement against defaulters and unauthorized connections etc.
Billing & Collection of Aquifer Water charges and implement the Legislations regarding Water Conversation as per directions of Hournable SCP, JWEC (LHC).
Long term planning and development for tapping additional water sources, Trement and diposal station for sewer water & its implementation to meet water supply and sewerage demand projected.
WASA also get Financial & Technical assistance from international organisations like JICA, UNDP, WB, EU, AIIB, ADB, DAFT (Australia) & BWW (Hungary) against Development Projects.

References

External links 
Water And Sanitation Agency

Public benefit corporations
Water companies of Pakistan
Government agencies of Punjab, Pakistan